Frances Julia Farrand Dodge (22 November 1878 – 12 January 1969) was an American artist and teacher.

Early life and education 

The eldest of four girls, Frances Farrand was born on 22 November 1878 in Lansing, Michigan.  Her father, Hart Augustus Farrand (1850–1938), had a grocery store in Lansing and her mother, Effie Ann Shank (1854–1918) was an accomplished wood carver who created much of the furniture for their home.

She studied art at the Art Academy of Cincinnati, the Michigan State University, Syracuse University, and the Art Students League of New York.  Among her teachers were Frank Duveneck, Lewis Henry Meakin, and Joseph Pennell.

In 1907 she married Arthur Charles Dodge (1880–1969) in Lansing, Michigan. The couple moved to Chicago, where she received specialized training in watercolor with Frederic Milton Grant (1886–1959), a student of William Merritt Chase.

Career and legacy

In the 1920s Dodge lived in St. Paul, Minnesota and Ohio, where she continued studying with Herman Henry Wessel (1878–1969).

In 1920 she was appointed president of the Cincinnati Art Club.

In 1921, she won the second prize in the Fine Arts Competition at the Minnesota State Fair. In 1926 and 1927 she exhibited "Danberry County Fair" and "A wood" at the Exhibitions of Etchings organized by the Chicago Society of Etchers and the Art Institute of Chicago.

She exhibited at the Art Institute of Chicago, the Pennsylvania Academy, and the National Association of Women Artists.

In 2011 the  Women's Historical Center and Hall of Fame in Lansing featured works by her from their own collection in Selected Works from the Michigan Women’s Historical Center Art Collection.

In 2014 Olivet College, in Michigan included her in an exhibition of overlooked female painters titled "Beautiful Things: Still Life Paintings by American Women 1880–1940.

Her works can be found in private collections and at the Smithsonian American Art Museum, the Mobile Museum of Art, the University of Nebraska State Museum, the Cincinnati Art Museum, the Academy Art Museum (Easton, MD), and the Cincinnati Art Galleries.

Notes

References

Sources 
 "Annual Report of the Minnesota State Agricultural Society", Minnesota State Agricultural Society, 1923, p. 196
 "The MSC Record", Volume 32, Issues 1 to 12, 1926, p. 14
 R. R. Bowker:  "Who's who in American Art", Volume 9, American Federation of Arts, 1953
 "The Alphi Phi Quarterly", Volume 66, Issue 2, 1954, p. 166
 "Annual Report of the Board of Regents of the Smithsonian Institution", Smithsonian Institution, 1959, p. 99
 Bell Shank Farrand Rahn: "Childhood Memoirs by the Four Farrand Girls" and "The Farrand House", 1961.
 "Tidewater Times" Vol. 10 No. 10, March 1966.
 Robert L. Crump: "Minnesota Prints and printmakers 1900–1945" p. 82, Ed. Minnesota Historical Society Press, 2009.
 Julie Aronson, Anita J. Ellis, Jennifer Howe:  "The Cincinnati Wing: The Story of Art in the Queen City", 2003, P. 210

External links 
 American Art News, vol. 20, No. 31, New York, 13 May 1922: American Art News, Vol. 20, no. 31
 Lansing State Journal, Obituary, Lansing, Michigan, 23 Jan 1969: Frances Farrand Dodge – artist – obituary
 Star Democrat Easton, 23 January 1948: Dodge

1878 births
1969 deaths
20th-century American women artists
20th-century American painters
American women painters
Syracuse University alumni
Michigan State University alumni
People from Easton, Maryland
Art Academy of Cincinnati alumni